Alnes lighthouse was established in 1852 to guide fishing boats safely to the harbor of the small fishing community of Alnes on Godøy island on the west coast of Norway.

History
The current lighthouse was built in 1876 and is still in operation with a few modifications.

The lighthouse was automated in 1982 and is now owned by the municipality of Giske. The galley and the tower are open for tourists from May through October, and the old keeper's house has a café and an exhibition hall where artwork from local artists are displayed. There is also a small historical museum inside the lighthouse tower. Only a 30-minute drive from Ålesund, it is easily accessible for visitors and is one of the most visited lighthouses in Norway.

See also

 List of lighthouses in Norway
 Lighthouses in Norway

References

External links

 Norsk Fyrhistorisk Forening 

Lighthouses completed in 1876
Lighthouses in Møre og Romsdal
1876 establishments in Norway
Giske